Anthony Hammond (born 16 March 1950) is an Australian former professional tennis player.

Hammond, a native of Perth, was a state Linton Cup representative and made the quarter-finals of the Western Australian Open in 1969. He featured in the singles main draw at six editions of the Australian Open without going past the first round. After leaving the tour he was head tennis pro at the Middletown Tennis Club in Ohio.

References

External links
 
 

1950 births
Living people
Australian male tennis players
Tennis players from Perth, Western Australia